The 2009 Men's EuroHockey Nations Trophy was the 3rd edition of the Men's EuroHockey Nations Trophy, the second level of the European field hockey championships organized by the European Hockey Federation. It was held from 1 to 8 August 2009 in Wrexham, Wales.

The tournament also served as a qualifier for the 2011 EuroHockey Championship, with the finalists Ireland and Russia qualifying. Ireland won their second EuroHockey Nations Trophy title by defeating Russia 2–1 in the final and the hosts Wales won the bronze medal by defeating the Czech Republic 5–2.

Qualified teams

Format
The eight teams were split into two groups of four teams. The top two teams advanced to the semifinals to determine the winner in a knockout system. The bottom two teams played in a new group with the teams they did not play against in the group stage. The last two teams were relegated to the 2011 EuroHockey Championship III.

Results
''All times were local (UTC+2).

Preliminary round

Pool A

Pool B

Fifth to eighth place classification

Pool C
The points obtained in the preliminary round against the other team are taken over.

First to fourth place classification

Semi-finals

Third place game

Final

Final standings

 Qualified for the 2011 EuroHockey Championship

 Relegated to the EuroHockey Championship III

See also
2009 Men's EuroHockey Nations Challenge I
2009 Men's EuroHockey Nations Championship
2009 Women's EuroHockey Nations Trophy

References

EuroHockey Championship II
Men 2
EuroHockey Nations Trophy
Sport in Wrexham
EuroHockey Nations Trophy
International field hockey competitions hosted by Wales